is a railway station in Isahaya, Nagasaki Prefecture, Japan. It is operated by JR Kyushu and is on the Nagasaki Main Line.

Lines

Station layout 
The station consists of an island platform serving two tracks. The station building is a stonework structure built to resemble a European church complete with sloping roofs and tower with stained glass. It is, however, unstaffed, and houses only a waiting room and automatic ticket vending machine. Access to the island platform is by means of a footbridge. A siding branches off track 1 and includes some vehicle sheds.

Adjacent stations

History
Japanese Government Railways (JGR) built the station in the 1930s during the development of an alternative route for the Nagasaki Main Line along the coast of the Ariake Sea. In the final phase of construction, a track was laid to link up between Tara and Yue. Through-traffic was achieved on 1 December 1934. On the same day, Konagai was opened as an intermediate station on this new stretch of track. At the same time, the route from Hizen-Yamaguchi through the station to Nagasaki was designated as part of the Nagasaki Main Line. With the privatization of Japanese National Railways (JNR), the successor of JGR, on 1 April 1987, control of the station passed to JR Kyushu.

Passenger statistics
In fiscal 2016, the daily average number of passengers using the station (boarding passengers only) was above 100 and below 323. The station did not rank among the top 300 busiest stations of JR Kyushu.

See also
 List of railway stations in Japan

References

External links
Konagai Station (JR Kyushu)

Nagasaki Main Line
Railway stations in Nagasaki Prefecture
Railway stations in Japan opened in 1934